HMS Calliope is a training centre and 'stone frigate' of the Royal Naval Reserve, located in Gateshead, Tyne and Wear.

History
A Tyne-based division of the Royal Naval Reserve was established in 1905, and used the old Calypso-class third-class cruiser  as its drill ship.  She served until 1951, when she was sold for scrapping, and was replaced by the Shoreham-class sloop HMS Falmouth (L34).  Falmouth was renamed Calliope, and was berthed at Elswick.  She served until 1968, when she too was sold for scrapping, after the Tyne Division moved ashore to a new Headquarters, which retained the name HMS Calliope.  In October 1985 it was awarded a place on the Roll of Honorary Freeman of the City of Newcastle.

Present day
Located next to the Gateshead Millennium Bridge HMS Calliope is the principal Training Centre for the North and North East of England, and serves as the home base for some 150 reservists. Members take part in local representational activities and Remembrance Day parades in Newcastle and Gateshead.

The Armed Forces Career Officer (AFCO) for all three services (RN incl. RFA, RAF & Army) is now housed within the building.

The unit's current commanding officer is Commander Chris Bovill.

Affiliated units
Royal Marine Reserve (RMR) Scotland - RMR Tyne (Detachment)
University Royal Naval Unit Northumbrian, serving the universities of Newcastle, Northumbria, Durham and Sunderland
Newcastle Armed Forces Career Service
Trojan Squadron of the Defence Technical Undergraduate Scheme
Durham School CCF
Royal Grammar School, Newcastle

See also
British Armed Forces
List of Royal Navy shore establishments

References

External links
 HMS Calliope at the Royal Navy's website 
 

 

Royal Navy bases in England
Military installations established in 1905
1905 establishments in England